Australia competed at the 1966 British Empire and Commonwealth Games in Kingston, Jamaica, from  4 to 13 August 1966. It was Australia's eighth appearance at the Commonwealth Games, having competed at every Games since their inception in 1930.

Australia won medals in nine of the ten sports that it entered.

Medallists
The following Australian competitors won medals at the games.

|  style="text-align:left; width:78%; vertical-align:top;"|

| width="22%" align="left" valign="top" |

Officials
Commandant & General Manager: Bill Young 
Assistant General Manager: Arthur Tunstall 
Team Secretary: David McKenzie 
Attache & Medical Officer: Dr Roger Parrish 
Physiotherapists: Leslie Bridges, Thomas Dobson 
Section Officials: Athletics Manager - Frederick Humphreys, Athletics Manageress - Mary Breen, Athletics Coaches - Kevin Dynan, Jack Pross ; Badminton Competitor/Manager - Kenneth Turner ; Boxing Manager/Coach - Harold Napper ; Cyycling Manager - Charles Manins, Cycling Coach/Trainer - Harry Browne ; Fencing Coach/Manager - Ivan Lund ; Shooting Competitor/Manager - James Kirkwood ; Swimming Manager - Ray McNamara, Swimming Manageresss - Leah Phillips, Swimming Men's Coach - Don Talbot, Swimming Women's Coach - Terry Gathercole ; Diving Coach - Jack Barnett ; Weightlifting Manager/Coach - Les Martyn ; Wrestling Manager/Coach - Hugh Williams

See also
 Australia at the 1964 Summer Olympics
 Australia at the 1968 Summer Olympics

References

External links 
Commonwealth Games Australia Results Database

1966
British Empire and Commonwealth Games
Nations at the 1966 British Empire and Commonwealth Games